Percy H. Whiting was an American author, newspaper reporter, sports editor, advertising writer, salesman, and professional speaker. From Chappaqua, New York, he rose to become Vice President of Dale Carnegie & Associates. He dedicated each of his books to his wife Gene.

Quotes by Whiting 
 “Selling, to be a great art, must involve a genuine interest in the other person's needs. Otherwise it is only a subtle, civilized way of pointing a gun and forcing one into a temporary surrender.”
 “Time is a fixed income, and as with any income, the real problem facing us is how to work successfully with our daily allotment.”
 “You can do anything if you have enthusiasm. Enthusiasm is the yeast that makes your hope rise to the stars. Enthusiasm is the sparkle in your eye, it is the swing in your gait, the grip in your hand, the irresistible surge of your will and your energy to execute your ideas.”
 “Anyone can learn to be funny* -- I know, because I did.” Footnote: “* Well, anyway--moderately funny.”

Bibliography
 The 5 Great Rules of Selling, McGraw-Hill (1957, rev.1978 by Dale Carnegie & Assoc.)
 How to Speak and Write with Humor, McGraw-Hill (1959)
 The Five Greats Problems of Salesmen and How to Solve Them, McGraw-Hill (1964)

Discography
 "Speaking For Profit" Businessmen's Record Club (1961) USA

References

American male writers